Othmar Saner was a Swiss footballer who played in the late 1930s and early 1940s. He played as a forward.

Saner joined Basel's first team during their 1936–37 season. After one test game, he played his domestic league debut for the club in the away game on 27 December 1936 as Basel were defeated 0–3 by Lausanne-Sport. He scored his first goal for his club on 28 February 1937 in the away game at the Charmilles Stadium against Servette as Basel were beaten 1–3.

Between 1936 and 1939 Saner played 43 games for Basel and scored 12 goals; 34 of these games were in the Nationalliga, 3 in the Swiss Cup and 6 were friendly games. He scored eight goals in the domestic league, one in the cup competition and the other three during the test games.

Following his time in Basel, Saner moved on and played one season for Cantonal Neuchatel. He played for Young Fellows Zürich in the 1942–43 Nationalliga season.

References

Sources
 Rotblau: Jahrbuch Saison 2017/2018. Publisher: FC Basel Marketing AG. 
 Die ersten 125 Jahre. Publisher: Josef Zindel im Friedrich Reinhardt Verlag, Basel. 
 Verein "Basler Fussballarchiv" Homepage

FC Basel players
Neuchâtel Xamax FCS players
SC Young Fellows Juventus players
Swiss men's footballers
Association football forwards